HNLMS Nautilus (M12) was a minelayer and  patrol vessel of the Royal Netherlands Navy (RNN). She was built in the Netherlands and served in the RNN between 1930 and 1941.

Construction and design 
Nautilus was laid down on 25 January 1929, launched on 30 October 1929 and commissioned into the Royal Netherlands Navy on 2 May 1930. The vessel was built at the Rotterdamsche Droogdok Maatschappij in Rotterdam and assigned yard number 158. 
The ship was designed to fulfill the function of both a minelayer and patrol vessel.

Service history 
As patrol vessel Nautilus monitored fisheries in the North Sea.

Second World War 
From February 1941 onwards the Nautilus performed escorting duties for convoys. On 22 May 1941, while escorting the merchant vessels Heklo and Murrayfield, the Nautilus collided with Murrayfield and shortly after sunk near the opening of the Humber near Saltfleet. All personnel were saved.

Notes

Citations

References

1929 ships
Minelayers of the Royal Netherlands Navy
Patrol vessels of the Royal Netherlands Navy
Ships built in Rotterdam
Ships built by Rotterdamsche Droogdok Maatschappij